Gabonothrips is a genus of thrips in the family Phlaeothripidae.

Species
 Gabonothrips grassei

References

Phlaeothripidae
Thrips genera